The White House Office of Public Engagement is a unit of the White House Office within the Executive Office of the President of the United States.  Under the administration of President Barack Obama, it was called the White House Office of Public Engagement and Intergovernmental Affairs. President Donald Trump restored the prior name of the White House Office of Public Liaison and separated the White House Office of Intergovernmental Affairs. President Joe Biden changed the name to the White House Office of Public Engagement but retained Trump's separate Intergovernmental Affairs Office in his administration.

The current director of public engagement is former mayor of Atlanta, Keisha Lance Bottoms, who assumed office in June 2022. On February 27, 2023, it was announced that Bottoms would be replaced by Stephen K. Benjamin in April 2023.

History
The Office of Public Liaison has been responsible for communicating and interacting with various interest groups. Under President Richard Nixon, Charles Colson performed public liaison work. President Gerald Ford first formalized the public liaison office after he took office in 1974, giving Nixon administration veteran William J. Baroody Jr. a mandate for OPL to become "an instrument for projecting the image of a truly open administration (in contrast to Nixon's) and to secure Ford's election in 1976. Under Baroody's direction, the office incorporated outreach efforts with consumers and women that had been located elsewhere in the White House, and the overall staff grew to approximately thirty. At the core of its activities was an aggressive campaign of regional conferences that enabled the nation's first un-elected president to tour the country in a campaign-like atmosphere and prepare the way for an eventual reelection campaign."

Some OPL heads used the office to push their own agendas. Midge Costanza used her time at OPL to broaden the influence of gays and lesbians in White House policy. Faith Ryan Whittlesey used her time at OPL to increase the influence of the Christian right and anti-communist groups, such as the Contras in Nicaragua.

Future cabinet secretary and U.S. senator Elizabeth Dole headed OPL under President Ronald Reagan from 1981 to 1983. Directors during Bill Clinton's administration included future cabinet secretary Alexis Herman, Maria Echaveste, Minyon Moore, and future John Kerry campaign manager Mary Beth Cahill.

In May 2009, Obama continued this theme and renamed the Office of Public Liaison the Office of Public Engagement. Under the Obama administration, the Office of Public Engagement had been referred to as "the front door to the White House, through which everyone can participate and inform the work of the President."

In April 2009, actor Kal Penn was named an associate director in the Office of Public Engagement. His role was said to include outreach to the Asian American and Pacific Islander communities and the arts community. Prior to the appointment, he was a permanent cast member in the television series House, and his acceptance required him to be written out of the series.

President Donald Trump initially announced his intention to appoint Anthony Scaramucci to oversee the Office of Public Liaison in his administration, pending a review of Scaramucci's finances by the Office of Government Ethics. However, George Sifakis was appointed instead in March 2017.

Joe Biden announced on November 17, 2020, that the office will be known as the Office of Public Engagement in his incoming administration, and was most recently headed by Cedric Richmond until his resignation in May 2022, when he was replaced by Adrian Saenz in an acting capacity.

List of directors
The following have held the office of Director of Public Liaison at the White House:

References

External links
 White House Office of Public Engagement
 White House Office of Intergovernmental Affairs
 Official website from the presidency of Barack Obama

Executive Office of the President of the United States
Public Liaison
Presidency of the United States
1974 establishments in Washington, D.C.
Government agencies established in 1974